Keith Raymond (born 1987) is an Irish hurler who plays as a centre-back for the Sligo senior team.

Born in Sligo, Raymond first played competitive hurling at juvenile and underage levels with the Calry/St. Joseph's club. He later joined the club's senior team and has experienced much success, including four Connacht medals. Raymond has also won eleven county championship medals.

Raymond was just fifteen years old when he made his debut with the Sligo senior team during the 2003 league. He subsequently became a regular member of the team and has won one Nicky Rackard Cup medal and two National Hurling League medals in different divisions.

Honours
Calry/St Joseph's
Connacht Junior Club Hurling Championship (4): 2009, 2012, 2013, 2016
Sligo Senior Hurling Championship (11): 2005, 2007, 2008, 2009, 2011, 2012, 2013, 2014, 2015, 2016, 2017

Sligo
Lory Meagher Cup (1): 2018
Nicky Rackard Cup (1): 2008
National Hurling League Division 3 (1): 2004
National Hurling League Division 4 (1): 2009

References

1987 births
Living people
Calry-St Joseph's hurlers
Sligo inter-county hurlers
Connacht inter-provincial hurlers
Hurling managers
Irish schoolteachers